Camu may refer to
Camu (name)
Camú River in the northern Dominican Republic
Barraute-Camu, French commune
Myrciaria dubia, a small tree from the Amazon rainforest, called camu camu